Burshtin is a Hasidic dynasty headed by Grand Rabbi David Eichenstein, the Burshteiner Rebbe. The main Burshteiner synagogue is located in Borough Park, Brooklyn.

The group originated in Burshtyn, now located in Ukraine, but was once part of Austria-Hungary. The Grand Rebbe is a scion of many great rabbinical dynasties, including Zidichov and Stretin. He has authored several books of Hasidic lore. He is a disciple of Grand Rabbi Joel Teitelbaum of Satmar. His brother, Grand Rabbi Isaac Menachem Eichenstein, is the Galanter Rebbe of Williamsburg, Brooklyn. His son, Rabbi Zeideleh has, in recent years,  been functioning as a "Rebbe in Waiting" offering auxiliary and complementing Rebbe services alongside the Grand Rebbe. The second son, Rabbi Luzer, leads the local chapter in the Williamsburg section of Brooklyn.

Name
The name 'Burshtin' is derived from Polish-Yiddish (bursztyn) or Ukrainian (Бурштин) for amber (German and Yiddish: Bernstein, Börnsteen „Brennstein“, lit. "burn[ing]stone"; lat. electrum or glaesum,  ēlektron).

Burshtin dynasty

Grand Rabbi Yitzchok Eichenstein of Ziditchov (1740-1800)
Grand Rabbi Yissochor Berish Eichenstein of Ziditchov (d. 1832), son of Rabbi Yitzchok
Grand Rabbi Yitzchok Eichenstein of Ziditchov (1805-1873), son of Rabbi Yissochor
Grand Rabbi Shlomo Yaakov Eichenstein of Ziditchov (d. 1886), son of Rabbi Yitzchok
Grand Rabbi Nochum of Burshtin
Grand Rabbi Eliezer of Burshtin
Grand Rabbi Yitzchok Menachem Eichenstein of Burshtin-Podheitz (1879-1943), son of Rabbi Shlomo Yaakov, son-in-law of Rabbi Nochum
Grand Rabbi Shlomo Yaakov Zeide Eichenstein of Burshtin (1899-1963), son of Rabbi Yitzchok
Grand Rabbi Yitzchok Menachem Eichenshtein, current Galanter Rebbe, son of Rabbi Shlomo Yaakov
Grand Rabbi Dovid Eichenstein, current Burshtiner Rebbe, son of Rabbi Shlomo Yaakov

Recent activities
The new Burshtin headquarters is in its final stages of completion and is located at 12th Ave and 56th Street in Brooklyn, New York. Burshtin opened a new synagogue in the Williamsburg section of Brooklyn serving the followers of Burshtin living in Williamsburg.

See also
History of the Jews in Poland
History of the Jews in Galicia (Eastern Europe)
History of the Jews in Ukraine

References

Jews and Judaism in Brooklyn
Hasidic dynasties
Hasidic Judaism in New York City
Jewish Galician (Eastern Europe) history
Jewish organizations based in New York City
Burshtyn